The European qualification for the 2008 Men's Olympic Volleyball Tournament was held from 1 September 2007 to 13 January 2008.

Elimination round
Dates: 1–9 September 2007
All times are local.
In case of an aggregate score tie, teams play a Golden Set to determine the winner.

|}

First leg

|}

Second leg

|}

Pre–qualification tournaments
The Qualification Tournament hosts Turkey, the three 2007 World Cup participants and the next-best ranked team from the 2007 European Championship which are not yet qualified directly qualified for the Qualification Tournament.

Tournament 1
Venue:  Arena Savaria, Szombathely, Hungary
Dates: 28 November – 2 December 2007
All times are Central European Time (UTC+01:00).

Preliminary round

Pool A

|}

|}

Pool B

|}

|}

Final round

Semifinals

|}

Final

|}

Final standing

Tournament 2
Venue:  Arena D'Évora, Évora, Portugal
Dates: 28 November – 2 December 2007
All times are Western European Time (UTC±0).

Preliminary round

Pool A

|}

|}

Pool B

|}

|}

Final round

Semifinals

|}

Final

|}

Final standing

Tournament 3
Venue:  PalaCatania, Catania, Italy
Dates: 28 November – 2 December 2007
All times are Central European Time (UTC+01:00).

Preliminary round

Pool A

|}

|}

Pool B

|}

|}

Final round

Semifinals

|}

Final

|}

Final standing

Second ranked teams
Russia and Bulgaria qualified for the 2008 Summer Olympics via the 2007 World Cup and are replaced by the top two second ranked teams.

|}

Qualification tournament
Venue:  Halkapınar Sport Hall, İzmir, Turkey
Dates: 7–13 January 2008
All times are Eastern European Time (UTC+02:00).

Preliminary round

Pool A

|}

|}

Pool B

|}

|}

Final round

Semifinals

|}

Final

|}

Final standing
{| class="wikitable" style="text-align:center;"
|-
!width=40|Rank
!width=180|Team
|- bgcolor=#ccffcc
|1
|style="text-align:left;"|
|-
|2
|style="text-align:left;"|
|-
|rowspan=2|3
|style="text-align:left;"|
|-
|style="text-align:left;"|
|-
|rowspan=2|5
|style="text-align:left;"|
|-
|style="text-align:left;"|
|-
|rowspan=2|7
|style="text-align:left;"|
|-
|style="text-align:left;"|
|}

External links
Official website

Volleyball Men Europe
Olympic Qualification Men Europe
Olympic Qualification Men Europe